International Journal of Persian Literature (IJPL) is an annual peer-reviewed academic journal covering Persian poetics, poetry, classical Persian philology, prose, and the literature of Iran and the broader geographical areas.
It is indexed in Emerging Sources Citation Index, European Reference Index for the Humanities and Social Sciences (ERIH PLUS), International Bibliography of Periodical Literature and Scopus.

References

External links
 

Iranian studies journals
Publications established in 2016
Persian studies
Annual journals
English-language journals
University of Pennsylvania Press academic journals